The 2022 Porsche Carrera Cup Great Britain is a multi-event, one-make motor racing championship held across England and Scotland. The championship features a mix of professional motor racing teams and privately funded drivers. It forms part of the extensive program of support categories built up around the BTCC centrepiece.

Rule changes

Technical
The outgoing Porsche 911 GT3 Cup (Type 991 II) car fleet was replaced by the latest generation of Porsche 911 GT3 Cup (Type 992) for all Porsche Supercup entrants from 2022 season onwards.

Teams and drivers

The following teams and drivers are currently signed to run the 2022 season.

Race calendar

Championship standings

Drivers' championships

References

External links
 

Porsche Carrera Cup Great Britain seasons
Porsche Carrera Cup Great Britain